Winners are emboldened.

References

2010 film awards
2010 in Nigerian cinema
2010
Culture in Ogun State